Xinqiao is a town of Chuanshan District, in the northwestern outskirts of Suining, Sichuan, People's Republic of China. , it has one residential community (社区) and 16 villages under its administration.

References 

Township-level divisions of Sichuan